Thomas Burgh (1707 – 23 June 1759) was an Irish politician who was MP for Naas (1731–1759).

Biography
Burgh was the son of the military engineer and architect Colonel Thomas Burgh MP and Mary Smyth. He represented Naas as a Member of Parliament in the Irish House of Commons between 1731 and his death in 1759. His successor as MP was his younger brother, Richard Burgh.

References

1707 births
1759 deaths
Irish MPs 1727–1760
Members of the Parliament of Ireland (pre-1801) for County Kildare constituencies
House of Burgh